Terje Olsen may refer to:

Terje Olsen (politician), former county mayor of Troms
Terje Olsen (footballer, born 1950), Norway international footballer who played for Vålerenga and Lillestrøm
Terje Olsen (footballer, born 1965), Norwegian footballer who played for Skeid, Strømmen and Vålerenga
Terje Olsen (footballer, born 1970), Norwegian footballer who played for Bayer Leverkusen
Todd Terje (born Terje Olsen, 1981), Norwegian DJ, songwriter, and record producer